Rosenbergia rufolineata is a species of longhorn beetles in the subfamily Lamiinae.

Description
This longhorn beetle differs from Rosenbergia straussi for the orange longitudinal lines (hence the Latin name rufolineata) evident in most of the specimens.

Distribution
This species can be found in New Guinea.

References

External links
 Insecterra Forum
 Cerambycoidea Forum

Batocerini